Plateau is a two-player abstract strategy board game invented by Jim Albea.

History 
The game was developed over a two-year period culminating in its present form on May 12, 1986.  The original name for the game was Pinnacle, but it was discovered that an older board/card game had that name, so around 1989 the name was changed to Plateau.

From the 1980s through the 1990s Plateau was played at Science Fiction conventions mostly in the Southeastern United States.  From the 1990s to the present, the game is played live at an online game site and via email.  In 1997 a computer implementation of the game was created which facilitates email play and has a computer robot.

Plateau is self-published by Jim Albea.

Rules 
The Official Rules are on the PlateauGame.com web site.

Goal 
There are two ways to win: 1) build a stack of six of your pieces on the board; or 2) capture six of your opponent's pieces.

Equipment 
A 4x4 square board and each player has 12 color-coded disks.

Opening Move 

Black moves first by picking out two of his pieces and placing them in a stack on the perimeter of the board. White does the same on a different perimeter square.

Subsequent Moves 
Players alternate moves.  A move can be one of three types:

1. Onboard a new piece.  Onboarding is adding one new piece to the play.

2. Move a stack already on the board.

3.  Exchange captured pieces.

Onboarding 
Onboarding is adding one new piece to the play.  This new piece can be placed anywhere that doesn't directly harm an opposing piece.  For instance, you can onboard to any blank square or on top of any of your own pieces.  The majority of Plateau moves are onboards.

Movement direction 
The direction that pieces move is determined by the color that is facing up.  Some of the pieces have different markers on their two sides.  Those pieces can be flipped over at the start of a move, which changes the direction they can travel.

When a piece has a blue side showing it moves diagonally.

When a piece has a red side showing it moves orthogonally (or straight).

When a piece has a blank side showing it can move either diagonally or orthogonally.

When the orange marker is showing the piece moves in a crooked fashion.  It moves one square straight and one square diagonally.

Movement distance 
A stack moves in a straight line up to one space for each piece in the stack.  As a stack is moving it can pick up and drop off friendly pieces from the bottom of the stack.  If it drops off pieces on opposing pieces then they become pinned, which means that they cannot move.  A stack can jump over any pieces as it moves.

BEFORE: In this example white starts with a stack of four pieces.

AFTER: White moves three spaces dropping pieces off along the way.

BEFORE: In this example white starts with a two-stack and a three-stack.

AFTER: White moves two spaces picking up the three-stack as it passes over.

Capturing pieces 
Pieces with a color marker facing up, called a weapon, can capture opposing pieces.  You capture pieces by landing a stack on top of them.  One piece is captured for each piece that lands on top.  Captured pieces are removed from the board and become prisoners.    When a stack performs a capture it has to stop its movement on that square. Captured pieces may be returned to the opposing player in a prisoner exchange.

BEFORE: In this example white has a two-stack with a weapon on top and black has a two-stack sitting on the next square.

AFTER: White moves on top of black and captures two pieces.

BEFORE: In this example there are three stacks on the board.  White has a two-stack with a weapon visible and a single piece on the next square.  Black has a two-stack that is pinning a white piece which is in turn pinning a black piece.

AFTER: White moves the two-stack two spaces picking up the single white piece along the way.  This gives white three pieces when he begins the capture of black's pieces.  Since he starts the capture with three pieces he can capture three pieces.

The Pieces 
Each player has 12 color-coded disks:

Four Mutes, which are blank on both sides.  Mutes are worth 1 point in prisoner exchanges.

Two Blues, which are blue on both sides.  Blues are worth 4 points in prisoner exchanges.

Two Reds, which are red on both sides.  Reds are worth 5 points in prisoner exchanges.

One Blue Mask which is blue on one side and blank on the other side.  Blue masks are worth 8 points in prisoner exchanges.

One Red Mask which is red on one side and blank on the other.  Red masks are worth 10 points in prisoner exchanges.

One Twister which is Orange on one side and blank on the other.  Twisters are worth 15 points in prisoner exchanges.

One Ace, which is red on one side and blue on the other.  Aces are worth 21 points in prisoner exchanges.

Prisoner Exchange 
Instead of Onboarding or Moving, a player can choose to spend his turn exchanging prisoners.  Prisoners are exchanged using the point values of the pieces.  A simple value-for-value system is used.  Since the pieces range in value from 1 point (for the mute) to 21 points (for the Ace) there are usually several combinations and options available for the players.

The player initiating the exchange selects the pieces he wishes to exchange.  These pieces will all add up to some point value.  The responding player then has four options depending on the point values of the prisoners that he holds.

Option 1: Give an equal value.  If he has a combination of values that exactly equals the value being tendered then he has to exchange those pieces, or exchange a higher value if he would prefer.
Option 2: Give a greater value. If he has any combination of values higher than the value being tendered he always has the option of exchanging a higher value.
Option 3: Give the next lower value.  If he doesn't have an exact match and chooses not to give a higher value, then he must exchange the next value below the value being tendered.
Option 4: Refuse the exchange.  If he doesn't have an equal value, doesn't have a lower value, and doesn't wish to exchange a higher value then he can refuse the exchange.

Hidden information 
Hidden information in the game consists of the true nature of the underside of pieces that have been onboarded.  The significance of this information is that pieces can be flipped at the start of a move possibly changing the direction they can travel or possibly transforming a blank into a weapon.  This information is revealed in the course of the game as pieces are flipped, captured, and onboarded.

The rule that controls this flow of information is called the One Hand Rule:  Any manipulations of pieces must be done with one hand in full view of the opponent.  For instance, if you on board a piece inside one of your stacks you must do it in three steps: 1. Take pieces off the top (which displays the nature of the top of the next piece down).  2. Place your onboarded piece on the stack (which reveals the top of that piece).  3. Return the upper pieces to the stack.

Before play begins and throughout the game the players arrange their unplayed pieces such that the opponent can't see them.  The game box is used as a shielding wall for this purpose.

You cannot inspect your opponent's uncaptured pieces.  When pieces are captured they can be freely inspected by both players.

General 
If a player has no legal moves, then his turn is forfeited.  A draw can be called by mutual agreement of the players.

External links
PlateauGame.com - The official Plateau Game site

Board games introduced in 1986
Abstract strategy games